Bagan Dalam is a suburb within the town of Butterworth, Penang, Malaysia. The place is named after Kampung Bagan Dalam which is a village situated within the core of the same area. Bagan Dalam means "inner jetty" in the Malay language. It is located near the Butterworth Wharves, also known as Dermaga Dalam in the Malay language. Bagan Dalam is connected to Perai, a major industrial area in the Seberang Perai region over the Perai River by the Prai River Bridge and the older Tunku Abdul Rahman Bridge.

Transportation 

Bagan Dalam has major transportation hubs in Butterworth, Penang (Seberang Perai at a larger extent) such as the Penang Sentral which is integrated with Butterworth railway station and the Sultan Abdul Halim Ferry Terminal.

Demographics 
According to the voter statistics released by the Election Commission of Malaysia (EC), of the total 18,613 voters, 51% are Chinese, followed by 25% Malay and 24% Indian.

Religion 
Among the key religious places of worship located here include 

Masjid Jamek Bagan Dalam is the only Mosque in the Bagan Dalam.  

Butterworth Mariamman Temple is one of the oldest place of worship in Butterworth. 

Gurdwara Butterworth (Sikh temple) was operated from the old building in New Ferry Road, before moving in to new building in Seberang Jaya.

Church of the Nativity of the Blessed Virgin Mary is one of the largest church in Butterworth.

Education

Primary schools 
 SK Kuala Perai
 SK Assumption
SK Convent, Butterworth 
SK Sungai Nyior, Butterworth
SK St Mark, Butterworth 
SJK (C) Chung Hwa 2

Secondary school 
 SMK Convent Butterworth

See also 
 Bagan Ajam
 Bagan Jermal
 Bagan Luar
 Butterworth, Penang

References 

Populated places in Penang